The Mil Mi-34 (NATO reporting name: Hermit) is a light helicopter designed by the Mil Moscow Helicopter Plant in either a two or four seat configuration for utility and training. It was first flown on 17 November 1986 and introduced at the Paris Air Show in 1987. The Mi-34 entered production in 1993, and is capable of performing aerobatic manoeuvres, including rolls and loops.

Variants
 Mi-34S – four seat production model powered by a 239 kW (325 hp) Vedeneyev (VOKBM) M-14V-26V nine-cylinder, air-cooled, radial engine mounted sideways in the fuselage, and equipped with modern avionics. A few aircraft were purchased by the Moscow police.
 Mi-34S2 "Sapsan" – turbine version of the Mi-34. It will be able to accommodate up to 4 passengers and the first deliveries are planned by the end of 2011. It will be powered by Turbomeca Arrius-2F
 Mi-34L – proposed version powered by a 261 kW (350 hp) Textron Lycoming TIO-540J piston engine. None built.
 Mi-34P Patrulnyi – Police patrol version for Moscow Mayor Office.
 Mi-34A – Luxury version, intended to be powered by an Allison 250-C20R turboshaft engine. None built.
 Mi-34M1 and Mi-34M2 – Proposed twin-turbine, six-passenger versions.
 Mi-34UT – trainer with dual control.
 Mi-34V or Mi-34VAZ or Mi-234 – proposed version powered by two VAZ-4265 rotary piston engines.
 Mi-44 – proposed development with TV-O-100 engine and refined aerodynamics. A mockup was built in 1987.

Operators

Military operators

Armed Forces of Bosnia and Herzegovina

Nigerian Air Force

Specifications (Mi-34S)

See also

Notes

References

 Jackson, Mark. Jane's All The World's Aircraft 2003–2004. Coulsdon, UK: Jane's Information Group, 2003. .

External links

 www.Aviation.ru

1980s Soviet civil trainer aircraft
Mil aircraft
1980s Soviet helicopters
Single-engined piston helicopters
Aircraft first flown in 1986